The 1999 East Dorset District Council election took place on 6 May 1999 to elect members of East Dorset District Council in Dorset, England. The whole council was up for election and the Conservative Party gained overall control of the council from the Liberal Democrats.

Election result

References

East Dorset District Council elections
1999 English local elections
20th century in Dorset